The Finnish Women's Volleyball Cup is a women's Volleyball competition held since the year 1968 in Finland, teams from the first tier league and second tier league compete every year in a knock out home and away system.

Competition history

Winners list

Honours by club

References

External links
 lentopallo.finland 

Volleyball in Finland